Khawla bint Jaʿfar al-Ḥanafīyya, also known as Umm Muḥammad, was one of the wives of the Muslim Caliph and Imam Ali ibn Abi Talib.

Biography
She was known as Hanafiyya after her tribe Banu Hanifa. When the people of Yamama were threatening the integrity of the newly emerging empire by refusing to pay the zakat (religious tax) to Abu Bakr, their men were all declared apostates and killed and she was brought to Medina as a slave girl together with the other womenfolk. When her tribesmen came to know her, they approached Ali and requested him to save her from the blemish of slavery and protect her family's honor and prestige. Consequently, Ali set her free after purchasing her and married her whereafter Muhammad ibn al-Hanafiyya was born.

Her important descendants

See also
Khawlah
Jaʽfar

References

Tabi‘un
7th-century Arabs
Ali